Nader Ragab (Arabic:نادر رجب) (born 12 September 1992) is an Emirati footballer who plays as a goalkeeper.

Career

Al-Shabab
Nader Ragab started his career at Al-Shabab and is a product of the Al-Shabab's youth system. On 4 March 2017, made his professional debut for Al-Shabab against Dibba Al-Fujairah in the Pro League.

Ittihad Kalba
On 26 July 2017 left Al-Shabab and signed with Ittihd Kalba.

Al Hamriyah
On Season 2018, left Ittihd Kalba and signed with Al-Hamriyah.

External links

References

1992 births
Living people
Emirati footballers
Al Shabab Al Arabi Club Dubai players
Al-Ittihad Kalba SC players
Al Hamriyah Club players
UAE Pro League players
UAE First Division League players
Association football goalkeepers
Place of birth missing (living people)